MapleStory DS is a role-playing video game for the Nintendo DS. It is an adaptation of the original MMORPG game for Windows titled MapleStory. The game was released on April 15, 2010 in Korea, and was developed by Nexon and published by Nexon and Nintendo of Korea. Unlike the PC version, MapleStory DS is a solely single-player game.

Gameplay
The game features many elements present in the original MapleStory, such as needing to fight monsters and complete quests in order to make the player character more powerful. The game also features 4 different character classes, two of which are unlocked after completing the game once.

Plot
After a jewel called Rubian causes the destruction of the kingdom of Sharenian via an ancient evil, it is split into four parts. Each playable character comes to acquire a piece of it and each sets out to unite with one another in order to recreate the jewel and expose and destroy the ultimate evil.

Development and release
The game was announced at E3 2006. On January 9, 2007, Nexon and the newly established Nintendo of Korea showcased MapleStory DS for the first time, releasing a trailer for the game. The game was first projected to be released in September 2007, but had since been subjected to numerous delays before its eventual Korean premiere on April 15, 2010. A unique MapleStory-themed Nintendo DSi was released alongside the game in Korea. In a 2010 interview with PC World's Matt Peckham, the CEO of Nexon America, Daniel Kim, stated that "MapleStory DS is for the Korean market only" when asked if there would ever be an English language version of the game. Despite this, in 2012, the director of MapleStory DS Hong Sungjoon, stated that there was some interest in porting the game to the Nintendo 3DS eShop, being ported five years later.

It was confirmed that MapleStory DS would not be an MMORPG in an interview with the manager of international business development at Nexon, Stephen Lee. Lee explained that the  game would simply be a single-player game with limited multiplayer features. In addition, it was announced that MapleStory DS would not support Wi-Fi. However, there was a coupon book in the options tab in which you could use codes to get special NX items in the original MapleStory.

Reception

Famicom Tsūshin scored the game a 28 out of 40.

References

External links
GameFAQs.com MapleStory DS Page

2010 video games
MapleStory
Nexon games
Nintendo DS games
Nintendo DS-only games
Side-scrolling role-playing video games
Video games developed in South Korea
Video games featuring female protagonists